Kate Russell (born c. 1968) is an English technology journalist, author, speaker, gamer and streamer.

Early career
Russell was brought up in Harpenden, Hertfordshire. She made her first TV appearance with her family in a pilot episode of the game show, Johnny Ball Games, presented by Johnny Ball. She appeared on children's television in the show Fish and Chips on Nickelodeon in 1995, but moved on to present on technology a few years later, fronting a show called Chips With Everything on The Computer Channel (later renamed to .tv).

Russell has previously featured regularly on CNBC Europe as both a reporter and producer. She has also appeared on GMTV and The Pod Delusion.

Current activities
Russell was a freelance reporter on the Webscape segment of the BBC technology show Click, which is broadcast in the UK on BBC News and internationally on BBC World News.

Kate left Click during the first UK Coronavirus lockdown in 2020 as she was going to try streaming as a source of income and this would be a conflict of interest with the BBC. 
After a chance encounter with a poorly ferret she had found while walking, Kate turned her shed into a ferret palace with the thought of having a rescue home for ferrets later.

The viewers of the stream named the ferrets. The darker one is called Lady Nibblington Chewington Wrigglesbury the First (Wriggles) and the pale one is called Lady Scrufflington Wigglebottom, of the Hertfordshire Wigglebottoms (Scruffles).

The ferrets are on several social media platforms. The complete backstory of how this came to be is on Youtube The back story of FerretTubeTV.

Ferret Tube Live Website

She writes a column called Tech Traveller in National Geographic Traveller magazine. She has previously written columns for Webuser, and the Original Volunteers website.

Russell's first published book Working the Cloud (2013) is a collection of tips and resources to help businesses better use the Internet.

She self-published her first short story, Taken (Scary Shorts Book 1), as a trial of Kindle Direct Publishing on 5 August 2011.

Russell's second book and first novel Elite: Mostly Harmless (2014), a story set in the Universe of the Elite computer games, was the result of a successful Kickstarter campaign which raised over 400% of its funding goal.

A third book and second novel A Bookkeeper's Guide to Practical Sorcery, a children's fantasy, was published in 2016. An audiobook version read by Charles Collingwood was the subject of another successful Kickstarter campaign.

Awards

In the 2015 UK Blog Awards she won the individual digital and technology category.

In 2016 she was voted the 13th most influential woman in UK IT by Computer Weekly.

Bibliography
Taken (Scary Shorts Book 1) (2011)
Working the Cloud: The Ultimate Guide to Making the Internet Work For You and Your Business (2013) 
Elite: Mostly Harmless (2014)
A Bookkeeper's Guide to Practical Sorcery (2016)

References

External links

Personal website

Kate Russell: Meet the BBC Click team

British reporters and correspondents
BBC World News
1960s births
Living people
People from St Albans
English non-fiction writers
British technology writers
Women technology writers
British technology journalists